Francisco Arturo Barrios Martínez also known by the name El Mastuerzo, is a Mexican musician, composer, record producer, actor and drummer of the band Botellita de Jeréz. El Mastuerzo is an active composer of rolas and founder of the artist collective Kloakas Komunikantes.

Works

Solo albums
 Prohibido (Culebra-BMG, 1996)
 Podrid@ Francisco Barrios El Mastuerzo y Karne de res (Ediciones Pentagrama, 2002)
 Kbezakhabla Zabalburu (Kloakas komunikantes, 2005)
 Tributo a la Otra Kancion Popular Mexikana, Rolópera en Seis Movimientos (Ediciones Pentagrama, 2006)

With Botellita de Jeréz
 Botellita de Jerez (1984)
 La Venganza del Hijo del Guacarock (1985)
 Naco es Chido (1987)
 Niña de mis Ojos (1989)
 Busca Amor (1990)
 Todo lo que digas será al revés (1992)
 Forjando Patria (1994)
 Superespecial Un Plug (1996)
 El Último Guacarrock (1998)

Other works
 Los nakos by Los nakos (Ediciones Nvl, 1976).
 La lengua. by Los nakos (Ediciones Nvl, 1980) 
 Del surrealismo, la picaresca y el humor by José de Molina, Sergio Magaña y Los nakos (Ediciones nvl, 1981).
 Contraconfesiones by José de Molina. (Ediciones Nvl, 1982).
 Manifiesto by José de Molina. (Ediciones Nvl, 1983).
 Terremotos by José de Molina. (Ediciones Nvl, 1986).

References

External links
 Official website
 Official site of Botellita de Jeréz

Mexican male songwriters
Mexican rock musicians
Mexican composers
Mexican male composers
Rock en Español musicians
Living people
Place of birth missing (living people)
Year of birth missing (living people)